Ottaviano Canevari (1565-1639) was an Italian nobleman, Doctor of law, Magistrate and Senator of The Republic of Genoa.

Biography 

Ottaviano was the son of Teramo Canevari (treasurer 1511–1592), and brother of Demetrio Canevari (physician, 1559–1625). Canevari studied in the Jesuit College of Brera in Milan, and was graduated in the same establishment, in 1584.

References

External links 
www.fondazionecanevari.it

1565 births
1638 deaths
16th-century Italian nobility
16th-century Genoese people
17th-century Genoese people